Hailles is a commune in the Somme department in Hauts-de-France in northern France.

Geography

History
The name probably comes from ‘haie’ (eng: hedge), and has been variously written as Haies or Heilles.
During the Franco-Prussian War of 1870, some francs-tireurs, hidden behind the town fired 60 times on a Prussian officer. All missed, he wasn't even scratched. The German troops threatened to burn down the town.

Population

See also
Communes of the Somme department

References

External links

 Hailles on the Quid website 

Communes of Somme (department)